Chhera Tamsuk is a Bengali drama film directed by Purnendu Pattrea based on a novel of Bengali writer Samaresh Basu. This film was released on 1 January 1974.

Plot

Cast
 Ranjit Mallick	
 Sumitra Mukherjee
 Biplab Chatterjee
 Nimu Bhowmik
 Bibhas Chakraborty
 Shyamal Sen
 Promode Ganguly
 Gopa Bandyopadhyay
 Shibnath Bandyopadhyay
 Dilip Bannerjee

References

1974 films
Bengali-language Indian films
1970s Bengali-language films
Indian drama films
Films based on Indian novels
Films based on works by Samaresh Basu

External links